Jeroom Snelders (born 1977) is a Belgian cartoonist and comics artist, who is frequently published in the magazine Humo.  He studied graphic design at St. Lucas in Ghent, where one of his teachers was Ever Meulen. He has published his work in the collections Rudy (2002) and Het Hol van de Reet (2003). His work is characterized by absurd humor and surreal situations.

He won the Belgium Press Cartoon 2002 and is engaged to Belgian athlete Élodie Ouédraogo.

External links
 Jeroom's website
 Lambiek Comiclopedia

Living people
1977 births
Belgian cartoonists
Belgian comics artists
Belgian humorists
Belgian illustrators
Belgian parodists
Belgian satirists
Flemish television writers
Male television writers
Belgian surrealist artists
Album-cover and concert-poster artists